Sir Reginald Frederick Brittain Bennett (b Sheffield 22 July 1911 – d London 19 December 2000) was an English Conservative Party politician, international yachtsman, psychiatrist and painter.

Education

Bennett was educated at Winchester College and New College, Oxford.

Military service

He was in the RNVR from 1934 to 1946.

Personal life

Bennett married Henrietta Crane in 1947: they had one son and three daughters. Lady Bennett died in 2018.

Sporting achievements

He was a helmsman of Shamrock V 1934-35 and was in the British America's Cup team in 1949 and 1953. He founded the Imperial Poona Yacht Club in 1934 as a light-hearted club for serious sailors; events include sailing backwards.

Political career

Bennett contested Woolwich East at the 1937 London County Council election, and the equivalent seat at the 1945 United Kingdom general election, but was not elected. He was Member of Parliament for Gosport and Fareham from 1950 to 1974, and after boundary changes, for Fareham from 1974 to 1979. He was Parliamentary Private Secretary to Iain Macleod 1956–63 and chaired the Parliamentary and Scientific Committee 1959–62. He was also chairman of the catering committee.

References
 Times Guide to the House of Commons October 1974

Offices held

Notes

1911 births
2000 deaths
People educated at Winchester College
Alumni of New College, Oxford
Conservative Party (UK) MPs for English constituencies
Politicians awarded knighthoods
UK MPs 1950–1951
UK MPs 1951–1955
UK MPs 1955–1959
UK MPs 1959–1964
UK MPs 1964–1966
UK MPs 1966–1970
UK MPs 1970–1974
UK MPs 1974
UK MPs 1974–1979
Royal Naval Volunteer Reserve personnel of World War II
British sportsperson-politicians